Sebastiana Gouvêa Moraes (born May 3, 1975, in Jataí, Goiás) is a Brazilian actress.

Biography 

She began her career as a photographic model and at 15 was already recognized by the commercial  Ellus, Fórum, São Paulo Alpargatas, DeMillus, Zoomp, among others. However, gained notoriety from a series of photo essays that began in Playboy Magazine in 1996, then presented as Botafogo's muse, a reference to her favorite team. Since then, highlighted by a sequence of several essays sexy.

On TV Nana starred in "Pantera do Faustão" in TV Globo (1996); Presented on "Domingo Milionário" com J. Silvestre na TV Manchete (1997); a regular star on "Banheira do Gugu" on SBT (1998/99); starred in the soap opera Porto dos Milagres on TV Globo (2001), JK (2006), Amazônia, de Galvez a Chico Mendes (2007) featured in the soap opera Bicho do Mato for TV Record (2006). In 2008, she did Faça Sua História (TV Globo) and Lendas Urbanas on SBT. In April 2011, Nana appeared in the soap opera Araguaia for TV Globo, where she plays Jamila, one that enchants an Arab tourist which she eventually whines up marrying.

Personal life 
Nana Gouvea married Carlos Keyes in 2011 and divorced in 2019. They got no kids. She lives in New York City since 2011. Nana is mother of two girls from her first marriage with Danny Alexanders Aguiar Silva from 1991 to 1993, Daphynie Katerine Gouvea Aguiar, born on March 14, 1992, and Angel Kathleen Gouvea Aguiar, born on May 31, 1993, shel also has one grandson, soon of Daphynie, Noah Gouvea Alcantara, born on October 12, 2016.

Filmography

Television

Film

References

External links 

1975 births
Living people
Brazilian expatriates in the United States
Brazilian female models
Brazilian television actresses
Brazilian telenovela actresses
Brazilian film actresses
People from Goiás
Naturalized citizens of the United States